The M69 Derby, formerly the A46 Derby, is a football match played between Coventry City and Leicester City. It takes its name from the motorway that connects the two cities, which are only 24 miles (38 km) apart.

Although neither side is the other club's traditional "arch rival", with Aston Villa considered Coventry's traditional rival and Nottingham Forest as Leicester's, the fixture became increasingly significant between 2001 and 2011 with both clubs' traditional rivals often being in different leagues, and the disillusionment of some Coventry fans with their traditional rivalry with Aston Villa.  According to a survey by The Football Pools published in 2008, this fixture is the 12th fiercest rivalry in English football.

However; the rivalry has declined in recent years as Leicester's rise up the leagues and successful period in the top flight, has coincided with Coventry City struggling financially, in-turn resulting into a lower league position in the Football League. With the clubs currently a division apart, with Leicester in the Premier League and Coventry City in the EFL Championship, the second tier of English football, do not currently meet in league football.

The derby has on occasion been marred by violence, the most recent in February 2008. Prior to that, another took place in Coventry in October 2004 where police officers were pelted with missiles.

Statistics 
The first fixture between the two clubs was a Second Division game on 27 September 1919 and resulted in a 1–0 win for Leicester. The biggest victory resulted in an 8–1 to Leicester in the League Cup at Highfield Road on 4 December 1964. Coventry have been heavily beaten on two other occasions at Filbert Street, with both matches ending in a 5–1 win for Leicester. The first was in 1924–25, when Arthur Chandler scored a hat-trick, and in 1984–85, when Gary Lineker scored a brace.

While Leicester is undefeated on their current home turf, this ended for Coventry when they lost 1–0 at the Ricoh Arena on 6 August 2011. Coventry were in the Premier League when they last won at Leicester on 7 April 2001, in a 3–1 win.

Game list (since 1984)

The most recent game resulted in a 2–0 win for Leicester at the King Power Stadium.

See also
Leicester City F.C.–Nottingham Forest F.C. rivalry
Derby County F.C.–Leicester City F.C. rivalry

References

England football derbies
Coventry City F.C.
Leicester City F.C.